Lyubov Ivanovna Yegorova (born 5 May 1966, Seversk), name also spelled Ljubov Jegorova, is a Russian former cross-country Olympic ski champion, multiple world champion (first time in 1991), winner of the World Cup (1993) and Hero of Russia. Lyubov Yegorova is an honorary citizen of Seversk (1992), Saint Petersburg (1994), and Tomsk Oblast (2005).

Career
Yegorova won several medals at the FIS Nordic World Ski Championships with three golds (4 × 5 km relay: 1991, 1993; 30 km: 1991), one silver (5 km: 1993), and two bronzes (5 km + 10 km combined pursuit, 30 km: 1993).  She also won the women's 15 km event at the Holmenkollen ski festival in 1994.  Additionally, Yegorova won a total of nine medals at the Winter Olympics, earning six golds and three silver. She was the most successful athlete at both the 1992 and 1994 Winter Olympics. She won the Holmenkollen medal in 1994 (shared with Vladimir Smirnov and Espen Bredesen).

Doping case
Yegorova made a decision to retire after the 1997 FIS Nordic World Ski Championships in Trondheim when she was disqualified for doping on bromantan, a stimulant drug. She was disqualified on 26 February 1997, three days after winning gold in the women's 5 km event, and stripped of that medal.

Return
She returned after the suspension to compete at the 2002 Winter Olympics but did not win a medal there.

Cross-country skiing results
All results are sourced from the International Ski Federation (FIS).

Olympic Games
 9 medals – (6 gold, 3 silver)

World Championships
 6 medals – (3 gold, 1 silver, 2 bronze)

World Cup

Season titles
 1 titles – (1 overall)

Season standings

Individual podiums
13 victories 
41 podiums

Team podiums

 12 victories 
 21 podiums

Note:   Until the 1999 World Championships and the 1994 Olympics, World Championship and Olympic races were included in the World Cup scoring system.

Personal life
She is the mother of Viktor Sysoyev.

See also
 List of multiple Olympic gold medalists
 List of multiple Winter Olympic medalists

References

External links
 
 Holmenkollen medalists – click Holmenkollmedaljen for downloadable pdf file 
 Holmenkollen winners since 1892 – click Vinnere for downloadable pdf file 
 Information on Yegorova's doping disqualification 
 Lyubov Yegorova 

1966 births
Living people
People from Seversk
Cross-country skiers at the 1992 Winter Olympics
Cross-country skiers at the 1994 Winter Olympics
Cross-country skiers at the 2002 Winter Olympics
Doping cases in cross-country skiing
Heroes of the Russian Federation
Holmenkollen medalists
Holmenkollen Ski Festival winners
Russian female cross-country skiers
Olympic cross-country skiers of the Unified Team
Olympic cross-country skiers of Russia
Olympic gold medalists for Russia
Olympic gold medalists for the Unified Team
Olympic silver medalists for Russia
Olympic silver medalists for the Unified Team
Russian sportspeople in doping cases
Olympic medalists in cross-country skiing
FIS Nordic World Ski Championships medalists in cross-country skiing
FIS Cross-Country World Cup champions
Medalists at the 1992 Winter Olympics
Medalists at the 1994 Winter Olympics
Tomsk State Pedagogical University alumni
Russian sportsperson-politicians
Recipients of the Order "For Merit to the Fatherland", 4th class
Herzen University alumni
Members of Legislative Assembly of Saint Petersburg
Northwestern Management Institute alumni